Finally is the third album from R&B group Blackstreet. It was released on Interscope Records on March 23, 1999. Finally was the only album to feature Terrell Phillips, after the departure of Mark Middleton. After the success of their multi-platinum last album Another Level, their label allowed them a bigger budget for the next album. Finally was recorded at Teddy Riley's studio Future Recording Studios based in Virginia Beach, Virginia. Originally given the working title Get Higher, the album was scheduled for a November 1998 release until it was pushed back to March 1999.

The album has high-profile guests, such as Janet Jackson, Stevie Wonder and Hezekiah Walker. The album also features several songs with string arrangements from conductor Jeremy Lubbock. The music video for the single "Girlfriend/Boyfriend" was directed by Joseph Kahn. Complete with computer animation and 3D graphics, the video was considered to be one of the most expensive at the time. Finally was critically acclaimed but a commercial disappointment, moving units at only a fraction of what their previous album sold. Shortly after the release of the single "Think About You", Riley left Blackstreet to reform his previous group Guy and Blackstreet were subsequently dropped by Interscope Records.

Despite the album's failure, a couple of songs have been covered by other artists. British singer Sonique covered the song "Drama" on her album Hear My Cry as a duet with R&B singer Calvin Richardson. Korean pop group SS501 later covered the song "In A Rush" live in one of their concert performances.

Track listing

Charts

References

Blackstreet albums
1999 albums
Albums produced by Teddy Riley
Albums produced by Warryn Campbell